{{DISPLAYTITLE:C17H22I3N3O8}}
The molecular formula C17H22I3N3O8 (molar mass: 777.085 g/mol) may refer to:

 Iomeprol
 Iopamidol

Molecular formulas